Salm-Horstmar was a short-lived Napoleonic County in far northern North Rhine-Westphalia, Germany, located around Horstmar, to the northeast of Münster. It was created in 1803 for Wild- and Rhinegrave Frederick Charles Augustus of Salm-Grumbach following the loss of Grumbach and other territories west of the Rhine to France. It was mediatised to the Kingdom of Prussia in 1813 and the Wild- and Rhinegrave was awarded a princely title within Prussia three years later.

Count of Salm-Horstmar (1803–1813)
 Frederick Charles Augustus (1803–1813)

Princes of Salm-Horstmar (1816-present)

 Wilhelm Friedrich, 1st Prince 1816-1865 (1799-1865)
  Otto I, 2nd Prince 1865-1892 (1833-1892)
  Otto II, 3rd Prince 1892-1941 (1867-1941)
  Philipp Franz, 4th Prince 1941-1996 (1909-1996)
 Philipp Otto, 5th Prince 1996–present (born 1938)
 Philipp, Hereditary Prince of Salm-Horstmar (born 1973)
  Prince Christian of Salm-Horstmar (born 1975)
 Prince Gustav Friedrich of Salm-Horstmar (born 1942)
 Prince Maximilian of Salm-Horstmar (born 1979)
  Prince Leopold of Salm-Horstmar (born 1982)
 Prince Johann Christof of Salm-Horstmar (born 1949)
  Prince Carlos Federico of Salm-Horstmar (born 1965)
 Prince Constantin of Salm-Horstmar (born 1994)
  Prince Adrian of Salm-Horstmar (born 1996)

References

Bibliography 
Alfred Bruns: Fürstentum Salm-Horstmar in: Gerhard Taddey: Lexikon der Deutschen Geschichte, Stuttgart, 1998, S. 1104f. Digitalisat
Gerhard Köbler: Historisches Lexikon der Deutschen Länder. 7.Aufl. München, 2007 S.302 S.605
Wilhelm Kohl: Das Bistum Münster: Die Diözese 4. Berlin, New York, 2004 (Germania Sacra NF 37,4) S.231ff.
Wilhelm Kohl: Das Bistum Münster: Die Diözese 1 Berlin, New York, 1999 (Germania Sacra NF 37,7) S.573-576

1803 establishments in Europe
1813 disestablishments in Europe
States of the Confederation of the Rhine
 
States and territories established in 1803